Exquisite corpse (from the original French term , literally exquisite cadaver), is a method by which a collection of words or images is collectively assembled. Each collaborator adds to a composition in sequence, either by following a rule (e.g. "The adjective noun adverb verb the adjective noun." as in "The green duck sweetly sang the dreadful dirge.") or by being allowed to see only the end of what the previous person contributed.

History
This technique was invented by surrealists and is similar to an old parlour game called consequences in which players write in turn on a sheet of paper, fold it to conceal part of the writing, and then pass it to the next player for a further contribution. Surrealism principal founder André Breton reported that it started in fun, but became playful and eventually enriching. Breton said the diversion started about 1925, but Pierre Reverdy wrote that it started much earlier, at least as early as 1918.

The name is derived from a phrase that resulted when Surrealists first played the game, "" ("The exquisite corpse shall drink the new wine.") André Breton writes that the game developed at the residence of friends at an old house in Montparnasse, 54 rue du Château (no longer existing). Besides himself he mentions Marcel Duhamel, Jacques Prévert, Yves Tanguy and Benjamin Péret as original participants.

Henry Miller often played the game to pass time in French cafés during the 1930s.

Picture consequences

Later the game was adapted to drawing and collage, in a version called picture consequences, with portions of a person replacing the written sentence fragments of the original.  The person is traditionally drawn in four steps: The head, the torso, the legs and the feet with the paper folded after each portion so that later participants cannot see earlier portions. The finished product is similar to children's books in which the pages were cut into thirds, the top third pages showing the head of a person or animal, the middle third the torso, and the bottom third the legs, with children having the ability to "mix and match" by turning pages.

Another variation of the exquisite corpse also called "picture consequences" is Telephone Pictionary, a game in which players alternate writing descriptions and matching illustrations based on the previous step.

Modern examples

[Exquisite Corpse] is a novel by gothic horror writer Poppy Z. Brite.
 Space and Time magazine builds a community exquisite corpse monthly on their website.The Book of Exquisite Corpse is a series of novels and short stories by award-winning dreampunk and speculative fantasy author, Anna Tizard. Each story is inspired by Exquisite Corpse, based on words submitted by readers on her website's "Play" page.Anna Tizard plays Exquisite Corpse "live" on her podcast, Brainstoryum, to brainstorm new story ideas. Listeners can submit words for the game on her online "Play" page.
The cut-up technique of William S. Burroughs and Brion Gysin was influenced by Surrealism.Naked Came the Stranger is a 1969 erotic novel written as a literary hoax to parody American literary trends of the time. The credited author is the fictive "Penelope Ashe", though it was written by twenty-four journalists led by Mike McGrady, with each author writing a chapter without any knowledge of what the others had written. 
 Exquisite Corpse is a literary magazine founded in 1983 (later in online version from 1999) published by Andrei Codrescu.
 Naked Came the Manatee (Putnam, 1996) is a mystery thriller parody novel. Each of its thirteen chapters was written, in sequence, by a different Florida writer, beginning with Dave Barry and ending with Carl Hiaasen.
 Exquisite Fruit is a variant conceived by members of the National Puzzlers' League in which a round of trivia questions are sequentially written by players, given an answer provided by each player at the start, and the resulting question posed to another player at the end.Folio of 28 Exquisite corpse drawings collected from Queensland Art Gallery's First Asia Pacific Triennial of Contemporary Art (APT1) artists’ retreat, Bangalow, NSW, 20–23 September 1993. Held in the QAGOMA Research Library collection.

 Art 
 The Narrative Corpse (Gates of Heck, 1995) is a comic book chain-story by 69 all-star cartoonists co-edited by Art Spiegelman and R. Sikoryak.
 The Breaking Boredom Project in graphic design, Cairo (2008)
 The Exquisite Corpse Adventure (Candlewick, 2011), commissioned by the Library of Congress, uses well-known children's authors and illustrators
Jake and Dinos Chapman have produced a number of exquisite corpses. 
 Eric Croes, Cadavre exquis, Chat Santiag (2017).  Croes used his exquisite corpse drawing to make this clay sculpture.

 Film and TV 
 Apichatpong Weerasethakul's 2000 film Mysterious Object at Noon uses this technique with a mixture of documentary and fictional film.
 The Exquisite Corpse Project is a 2012 feature-length comedy film written using the exquisite corpse technique.
 Toonami did an exquisite corpse ident for their 20th anniversary to the song "Let's Fight" by Amon Tobin.
 A Rick and Morty 2017 trailer for season 3 is titled "Exquisite Corpse" and features a multiple minute long sequence to the song "Thursday in the Danger Room" from the album Run the Jewels 3 by Run the Jewels.Exquisite Corps and And So Say All of Us are choreographic versions by filmmaker Mitchell Rose.

 Music 
In the 1940s, composers John Cage, Virgil Thomson, Henry Cowell, and Lou Harrison, composed a set of pieces using this same process—writing a measure of music, with 1 or 2 additional notes (sources differ), folding it on the bar line then passing it to the next person. The pieces were later arranged by Robert Hughes and published as Party Pieces.
The band Bauhaus have a track titled "Exquisite Corpse" on their third studio album (The Sky's Gone Out) (1982), which appears to have been created in this collaborative surrealist style. They returned to the method for 2022’s “Drink the New Wine,” their first new song in 14 years. 
The fifth track on the 1992 album Sacred City by the British rock band Shriekback is titled "Exquisite Corpse".
Tiemko have a track titled "In Memoriam" on their fourth studio album (Clone) presented as a "musical exquisite corpse" (1995).
Exquisite Corpse started in 1992 as a solo project of Robbert Heynen when he was still a member of the Psychick Warriors Ov Gaia. After Reassembling Reality, Debbie Jones (aka The Mixtress/DJ Venus) joined the project and Exquisite Corpse became eXquisite CORpsE (1993). 
 A song in the musical Hedwig and the Angry Inch (1998) is entitled "Exquisite Corpse".
The musician Daedelus named their album Exquisite Corpse (2005). 
The band Warpaint named their debut EP Exquisite Corpse (2008) because of their collaborative songwriting style.
 George Watsky's 2016 album, x Infinity, features a song titled "Exquisite Corpse" using this technique featuring verses by several artists.
Australian sound art collective Little Songs of the Mutilated use the exquisite corpse process to create music, as well as the song and album titles, for their ongoing series of monthly collaborative releases.
In December 2019, French alternative-pop-rock band Therapie TAXI released an album entitled Cadavre Exquis, relating to the artistic visuals and collaborative production of the opus.
Swedish composer Anders Hillborg uses the technique in his 2002 orchestral work Exquisite Corpse.

 Architecture 

 In 2018, Simon Weir began producing catenary vaults where a dozen designers collaborate blindly using the Exquisite corpse method.

 Games 
In ... and then we died'', players use word fragment tarot cards to form words to tell the story of their collective deaths.
monsterland.net is an online version of the Exquisite Corpse parlor game created by Ben Samworth Development Ltd.

See also
 Photoshop tennis
 Poietic Generator
 Comic jam
 Round-robin story
 Mindmap
 Surrealist techniques
 Chinese whispers
 Mad Libs

Notes

External links

Exquisite Corpse (2006–2014), a collaborative digital illustration by artists James apRoberts and Brian Christopher

Paper-and-pencil games
Surrealist techniques
Collaboration
Random text generation
Collaborative writing
Language and mysticism